Robert Roberts (January 1, 1848 - February 23, 1939) was an American attorney and politician from Vermont. Among the offices he held, Roberts was twice mayor of Burlington, first from 1899 to 1901, and again from 1911 to 1913.

Early life
Robert Roberts was born in Manchester, Vermont on January 1, 1848, a son of Daniel Roberts and Caroline Diantha (Martindale) Roberts. He attended Burlington High School in Burlington and Manchester's Burr and Burton Seminary, then began attendance at the University of Vermont. While in college, Roberts joined the Delta Psi fraternity and Phi Beta Kappa. After graduating in 1869, Roberts attended Columbia Law School for a year, then continued his studies in French at schools in Paris and Geneva. While studying in Europe, Roberts was a correspondent for several newspapers in the United States.

Legal career
Roberts was admitted to the bar in 1871 and began to practice in Burlington. A Republican, Roberts began a career in politics and government when he was appointed reporter for the Vermont Senate's sessions of 1874, 1878 and 1880.

In 1876 and 1877, Roberts practiced law in Chicago. He then resumed residence in Burlington, where he practiced law in partnership with his father. They maintained the firm of Roberts & Roberts until Daniel Roberts died in 1899, after which Robert Roberts practiced alone.

Roberts was a member of the Merchants National Bank board of directors, the University of Vermont board of trustees, and the board of trustees of the Vermont State Library. Roberts's civic and professional memberships included the Vermont Bar Association, Ethan Allen Club, Algonquin Club, Sons of the American Revolution and Waubanakee Golf Club.

In 1910, he compiled and published the Vermont Digest, a reference work on the decisions of the Vermont Supreme Court. In compiling this work, Roberts revised 60 volumes of decisions that had previously been compiled by his father, and updated it to 82 volumes.

Political career
From 1882 to 1884, Roberts represented Burlington in the Vermont House of Representatives. While in the House, Roberts was a member of the judiciary committee and chairman of the committee on revised bills. From 1887 to 1889, he was Burlington's city attorney.

From 1890 to 1892, Roberts represented Chittenden County in the Vermont Senate. During his Senate term, Roberts was chairman of the judiciary committee.

In 1899 and 1900, Roberts won election as mayor of Burlington, and he served from April 1899 to April 1901. In 1911, he was again elected mayor, and he served until 1913.

Death and burial
Roberts died at his home in Burlington on February 23, 1939. For several years before his death, Roberts was the University of Vermont's oldest living graduate. Roberts's funeral took place at the Congregational church on College Street, and honorary pallbearers included Guy W. Bailey, Harland B. Howe, James Edmund Burke, Clarence H. Beecher, and John Holmes Jackson. Roberts was buried at Lakeview Cemetery in Burlington.

Family
In 1886, Roberts married Minnie Elizabeth Lyman (1861-1940). They were married until his death, and had no children.

References

Sources

Books

Newspapers

External links

1848 births
1939 deaths
People from Manchester, Vermont
Politicians from Burlington, Vermont
University of Vermont alumni
Vermont lawyers
19th-century American politicians
Mayors of Burlington, Vermont
Republican Party members of the Vermont House of Representatives
Republican Party Vermont state senators
Burials at Lakeview Cemetery (Burlington, Vermont)